Che Xiaoxi (born 3 March 1993) is a Chinese table tennis player. She won the women's singles title at both the 2013 and 2015 Summer Universiade.

Achievements

ITTF Tours
Women's doubles

References

Table tennis players from Heilongjiang
People from Daqing
1993 births
Living people
Chinese female table tennis players
Universiade medalists in table tennis
Universiade gold medalists for China
Universiade silver medalists for China
East China University of Science and Technology alumni
Medalists at the 2013 Summer Universiade
Medalists at the 2015 Summer Universiade